Hypebaeus is a genus of beetles belonging to the family Melyridae.

The species of this genus are found in Europe and Northern America.

Species:
 Hypebaeus albifrons (Fabricius, 1775)
 Hypebaeus albo-facialis J.Sahlberg, 1908

References

Melyridae
Cleroidea genera